Oregon Route 99E Business (OR 99E Business) is a business route through Salem, Oregon for Oregon Route 99E, which bypasses downtown via Interstate 5 (I-5). A portion of this highway was originally planned to be a freeway, signed as Interstate 305; however the proposed freeway was cancelled after community opposition.

Route description

The northern end of OR 99E business is at an intersection with OR 99E north of the Salem area. It runs east for approximately  along Salem-maintained Chemawa Road to an interchange with I-5 and Salem Parkway (officially Salem Highway #72) near Keizer. In downtown Salem, the highway skirts downtown along Front Street, where it interchanges with and shares an alignment with Oregon Route 22. OR 22/OR 99E then leave downtown via Pringle Parkway, skirting the southern edge of the Willamette University campus, then, via a pair of ramps, interchange with Mission Street. The highways then head southeast for  until an interchange with I-5 and OR 99E. This interchange marks the end of OR 99E Business; OR 22 continues to the east along North Santiam Highway.

History

The route which is now Salem Parkway was originally planned to be a freeway (Salem Freeway #65), which was to be signed as Interstate 305. It was designated as Salem Freeway Highway No. 65 by the state government in 1968. Local opposition cancelled the freeway in 1976 and the state government requested its withdrawal from the Interstate System in 1977. Despite the cancellation of I-305, Salem Parkway was later built as an undivided expressway.

The original alignment of OR 99E through Salem came from the south off I-5 onto Commercial Street and left to the north on Portland Road to cross I-5. In May 1986, due to Salem Parkway opening north of downtown, OR 99E was rerouted onto I-5 around Salem, and its old route south of downtown, along with the Salem Parkway and Chemawa Road north of downtown, became OR 99E Business. In March 1992, OR 99E Business was moved onto OR 22 southeast from downtown.

A section of OR 219 served part of this corridor, traveling on Broadway and River Road, until it was truncated.

Future
The Oregon Department of Transportation (ODOT) and the City of Salem are considering building an additional bridge across the Willamette River, north of the current Marion and Center Street bridges (which carry OR 22 across the river, and are the only river crossings for motor vehicles in the city). The exact location and alignment of this proposed new bridge and its connecting routes is presently under study, but generally, the routes being considered would connect to OR 99E Business at or near the southern end of Salem Parkway on the river's eastern shore, and provide access to both OR 22 and OR 221 on the western side. Such a route would be similar to that proposed for I-305.

Major intersections

References

099E Business
U.S. Route 99
Transportation in Marion County, Oregon
Keizer, Oregon
Transportation in Salem, Oregon